Khvoshab or Khvosh Ab or Khooshab or Khushab or Khush Ab or Khoshab or Khosh Ab or Khowsh Ab or Khowshab may refer to:
 Khvoshab, former name of Jaleq, a city Sistan and Baluchestan Province
 Khvosh Ab, Bushehr
 Khvoshab-e Olya, Hamadan Province
 Khvoshab-e Sofla, Hamadan Province
 Khvosh Ab, Farashband, Fars Province
 Khvosh Ab, Jahrom, Fars Province
 Khvosh Ab, Qir and Karzin, Fars Province
 Khowshab, Khuzestan
 Khoshab, Khuzestan
 Khowshab, Kohgiluyeh and Boyer-Ahmad
 Khvoshab, Kohgiluyeh and Boyer-Ahmad
 Khvoshab, Sanandaj, Kurdistan Province
 Khvoshab, Mazandaran
 Khvoshab, Bardaskan, Razavi Khorasan Province
 Khoshab, Khoshab, Razavi Khorasan Province
 Khoshab County, in Razavi Khorasan Province
 Khvoshab, Sistan and Baluchestan
 Khvoshab, South Khorasan

See also
 Khashab (disambiguation)
 Khushab (disambiguation)
 Khushab, Pakistan